Kazimierz Mariusz Kleina (born February 21, 1958 in Sierakowice) is a Polish politician. He was elected to the Sejm on September 25, 2005, getting 7896 votes in the 26th Gdynia district, as a candidate from the Civic Platform list.

He was also a member of the Senate 1997-2001 and has been a member since 2007.

Kazimierz Kleina was born in Sierakowice, Pomeranian Voivodeship, Kashubia. He graduated from the University of Gdańsk with a degree in transport economics. Kleina worked as a teacher in Żukowo. He speaks fluent Kashubian.

References

Bibliography
 J. Borzyszkowski, D. Albrecht (red.): Pomorze - mała ojczyzna Kaszubów. Historia i współczesność. Kaschubisch-Pommersche Heimat. Geschichte und Gegenwart, Gdańsk-Lubeka 2000, p. 494 (German/Polish)

Living people
Civic Platform politicians
Members of the Polish Sejm 2005–2007
Members of the Senate of Poland 1997–2001
Members of the Senate of Poland 2001–2005
Members of the Senate of Poland 2005–2007
Members of the Senate of Poland 2007–2011
Members of the Senate of Poland 2011–2015
Members of the Senate of Poland 2019–2023
1958 births
People from Kartuzy County
University of Gdańsk alumni